Nuffield Theatre may refer to:

 Nuffield Theatre, at Lancaster Arts at Lancaster University
 Nuffield Theatre, Southampton, at the University of Southampton